Cindy Ong Pik Yin is a Malaysian competitive swimmer. She has been swimming competitively since 1989 and has qualified for 2004 Athens Olympic Games in four events. She is a five-time world champion.

Early life 
Ong was born in Ipoh, Perak, Malaysia. She is the younger sibling of Allen Ong, Malaysian former swimmer, and niece of Ong Mei Lin, who was one of Malaysia's first female swimmers to represent the country in the Olympics.

Career

Swimming 
Training and competing throughout pregnancy, she clinched second place at the Malaysia Masters Speedo International Championship despite being 8 months pregnant.

In 2017, Ong competed in her first World Masters Championship.

Seven months following the delivery of her third child, she competed among 9,000 participants in the 2017 FINA World Masters in Budapest, Hungary, placing 5th in the 100m Freestyle event.

Her unique blend of physical & mental performance keeps her agile at 36 years old. She snagged the title of World No.1 in the 2020 FINA World Masters 50 meter Freestyle race.

Ong is currently ranked No. 2 in the 100 meter Butterfly, out touched by Spain's Erika Villa.

Coach 
Ong is also a certified swimming coach.
Amateur Swimming Union of Malaysia (ASUM) Level 2 Swimming Coach
 Amateur Swimming Union of Malaysia (ASUM) Certified Swimming Instructor
 National Sports Council of Malaysia (NSC) Level 2 Sports Science
 Amateur Swimming Union of Malaysia (ASUM) Technical Official Grade 3
 Life Saving Society Malaysia (LSSM) Bronze Medallion
 Life Saving Society of Malaysia Certificate of Cardio Pulmonary Resuscitation (LSSM CPR)
 International Life Saver (ILS)
 Ex-head coach, Stingray Swimming Club (2006-2011)

Accolades 
She was presented with the title of Perak's Sportswoman of the Year in 2005, in recognition of breaking 5 Malaysia national records, winning 6 gold medals and bagging the Best Sportswoman title at the 2004 SUKMA Games.

For all of these, and for her significant contribution to the overall Malaysian swimming sport, Ong was awarded the Pingat Pekerti Terpilih title in 2006.

In the 2004 Sukma Games, Ong won 6 gold medals, contributed 12.8% of the medal tally for Perak and was awarded the Best Sportswoman Award.

In the 2019 FINA World Masters Championship in Gwangju, South Korea, Ong won 5 gold and 2 silver medals from that championship.

Shortly after, she was recognized by The Malaysia Book of Records for the Most Gold Medals Won by an Individual Swimmer in a World Masters Championship (FEMALE) in 2019.

Education 
Ong was awarded the Drury Academic Honor Scholarship and obtained a Bachelor of Arts (Hons) in Psychology & Sociology from Drury University, Missouri, United States.

Personal life 
Ong is married to an Asian American who is the regional director of a Big Tech company. She has three children: Hayden, Kiara, and Connor.

Sexual Assault

In May 2021, Ong came forward on how she had encountered sexual harassment and assault over the years, including from a national coach when she was a teenager. After this was shared, then the former Youth and Sports Minister, Datuk Seri Reezal Merican Naina Merican ordered his officers and the National Sports Council (NSC) to contact and assist Ong and help lodge a police report about the acts committed on Ong. Ong decided not to pursue a case against the coach or publicly name him as she believed too much time has passed. Ong is now an advocate for anti sexual harassment and wishes to be a catalyst of change for others.

Discovering a missing plane

Ong's grandfather was reported to be the one of the first Malaysians to own a private airplane. However,  the current status and the condition of the airplane are unknown. Ong is now actively searching for the plane's current whereabouts.

Prominent awards and rankings

Masters Swimming

Malaysian Amateur Swimming achievements

Collegiate achievements in the United States

References 

Malaysian female butterfly swimmers
1984 births
Living people
People from Ipoh
Southeast Asian Games competitors for Malaysia
Malaysian female breaststroke swimmers
Malaysian female freestyle swimmers